Suillellus caucasicus is a species of bolete fungus in the family Boletaceae. It was first described as a variety of Boletus luridus in 1947 by Rolf Singer, then as an independent species by Singer in 1966. The name change in the latter publication was invalid, so Carlo Luciano Alessio published the new combination validly in 1985.

References

External links

caucasicus
Fungi described in 1985
Fungi of Europe
Taxa named by Rolf Singer